The Order of St Alexander was the second highest Bulgarian order during the Kingdom of Bulgaria. It was established by Knyaz Alexander I and named after his patron saint (Alexander Nevsky).

History
The order was established with a decree on 25 December 1881, in honour of the patron saint of Alexander Battenberg. Initially it was planned to have five grades and a Necklace but subsequently four grades and Grand and Lesser Necklace were formed and in 1908 a Grand Cross was added. With time wartime grades with swords in the middle and above the cross were added. The order was awarded to Bulgarian and foreign citizens with the personal benevolence of the Bulgarian monarch, who was the Grand Master.

Description
The order had a white enamelled cross pattée with golden or silver edges according to the grade. On the pendant of the obverse there was a stylized inscription with the name of the order and on the surrounding ring there was the motto СЪ НАМИ БОГЪ (God with us) with laurel wreaths below. On the reverse there was a white background with inscription 19 ФЕВРАЛЪ 1878 (19 February 1878) - the date of the signing of the Treaty of San Stefano. Atop the cross was a royal crown. The first grade was worn with a crimson moire ribbon over the right shoulder with a rosette in the edge. It had its own eight-ray silver star with the obverse of the order placed in the middle.

The Grand necklace consisted of thirty interconnected medallions with crowned lions, alternated with the monogram of the founder Knyaz Alexander I and eight edges Orthodox cross. There was a special issue with two field marshal's batons which belonged to Tsar Ferdinand.

The Lesser Necklace was similar to the Grand Necklace but in smaller size.

The Grand Cross, established in 1908, was also similar to the initial issue but the cross was enamelled in green and in the middle of the pendant was placed a crowned Bulgarian lion. The star was of similar design with green ring around the crowned lion on red background.

The other grades are like the first issue but smaller in size. The sixth grade was made in silver without enamel over the shoulders of the cross.

The Ottoman sultans Abdul Hamid II and Mehmed V were respectively awarded the Grand and Lesser Necklace of the Order of St Alexander with diamonds. They are currently kept in the collection of the Topkapı Palace in Istanbul.

Grades
Great Cross of the Order of St Alexander, Grand and Lesser Necklace
I grade, Grand Cross. Awarded to senior state officers and military personnel. It was worn with a scarf over the shoulder.
II grade, Grand Officer Cross. The cross was with white enamel, it was worn with red ribbon and had a star.
III grade, Commander Cross. The cross was with white or green enamel (according to the emission), it was worn with red ribbon and had no star.
IV grade, Officer Cross. The cross was with white enamel, it was worn on the chest with triangle red ribbon with rosette, it had no star.
V grade, Officer Cross. The cross was with white enamel, it was worn on the chest with triangle red ribbon, it had no star.
VI grade, Silver Cross. The cross was made of silver with no enamel, it was worn on the chest with triangle red ribbon, it had no star.

Notable recipients 

I grade, Grand Cross
 Abdul Hamid II
 Giacomo Acerbo
 Duke Adolf Friedrich of Mecklenburg
 Alois Lexa von Aehrenthal
 Albert I of Belgium
 Albert, 8th Prince of Thurn and Taxis
 Alexander I of Yugoslavia
 Alexander of Battenberg
 Prince Alexander of Hesse and by Rhine
 Duke Alexander of Oldenburg
 Alfred, 2nd Prince of Montenuovo
 Grand Duke Andrei Vladimirovich of Russia
 Mustafa Kemal Atatürk
 Prince August Leopold of Saxe-Coburg and Gotha
 Theodor Avellan
 Leopold Berchtold
 Victor, Prince Napoléon
 Boris III of Bulgaria
 Kiril Botev
 Walther von Brauchitsch
 Bernhard von Bülow
 Prince Carl, Duke of Västergötland
 Charlotte of Schaumburg-Lippe
 Constantine I of Greece
 Duke Constantine Petrovich of Oldenburg
 Théophile Delcassé
 Radko Dimitriev
 Grand Duke Dmitry Konstantinovich of Russia
 Elena of Montenegro
 Eleonore Reuss of Köstritz
 Ernest Louis, Grand Duke of Hesse
 Ernst Gunther, Duke of Schleswig-Holstein
 Ernst II, Duke of Saxe-Altenburg
 Ferdinand I of Bulgaria
 Ferdinand I of Romania
 Prince Francis Joseph of Battenberg
 Frederick VIII of Denmark
 Frederick Francis III, Grand Duke of Mecklenburg-Schwerin
 Frederick Francis IV, Grand Duke of Mecklenburg-Schwerin
 Pietro Gazzera
 Prince Georg of Bavaria
 Giovanna of Italy
 Agenor Maria Gołuchowski
 Sergey Gorshkov
 Wilhelm von Hahnke
 Ulrich von Hassell
 Prince Henry of Prussia (1862–1929)
 Prince Henry of Battenberg
 Duke Henry of Mecklenburg-Schwerin
 Paul von Hindenburg
 Prince Konrad of Hohenlohe-Schillingsfürst
 Dietrich von Hülsen-Haeseler
 Nikola Ivanov
 Duke John Albert of Mecklenburg
 Archduke Joseph August of Austria
 Archduke Joseph Karl of Austria
 Karl August, 10th Prince of Thurn and Taxis
 Gustav von Kessel
 Stiliyan Kovachev
 Hermann Kövess von Kövessháza
 Prince Kuni Kuniyoshi
 Aleksey Kuropatkin
 Vasil Kutinchev
 Kyril, Prince of Preslav
 Velizar Lazarov
 Archduke Leopold Ferdinand of Austria
 Archduke Leopold Salvator of Austria
 Émile Loubet
 Louis IV, Grand Duke of Hesse
 Prince Louis of Battenberg
 August von Mackensen
 Maria of Yugoslavia
 Princess Marie Louise of Bourbon-Parma
 Prince Maximilian of Baden
 Grand Duke Michael Mikhailovich of Russia
 Milan I of Serbia
 Jovan Mišković
 Helmuth von Moltke the Younger
 Benito Mussolini
 Sava Mutkurov
 Nicholas II of Russia
 Prince Nicholas of Romania
 Danail Nikolaev
 Prince Paul of Yugoslavia
 Prince Pedro Augusto of Saxe-Coburg and Gotha
 Racho Petrov
 Philipp, Landgrave of Hesse
 Prince Philippe, Duke of Orléans (1869–1926)
 Hans von Plessen
 Erich Raeder
 Prince Rudolf of Liechtenstein
 Mihail Savov
 Margarita Saxe-Coburg-Gotha
 Grand Duke Sergei Alexandrovich of Russia
 Grand Duke Sergei Mikhailovich of Russia
 Duke Siegfried August in Bavaria
 Zahari Stoyanov
 Alfred von Tirpitz
 Georgi Todorov (general)
 Stefan Toshev
 Stefan Tsanev
 Umberto II of Italy
 Prince Valdemar of Denmark
 Illarion Vorontsov-Dashkov
 Prince Waldemar of Prussia (1889–1945)
 Wilhelm II, German Emperor
 Wilhelm, German Crown Prince
 William Ernest, Grand Duke of Saxe-Weimar-Eisenach
 William, Prince of Hohenzollern
 Sergei Witte
 Nikola Zhekov
 Arthur Zimmermann
 August zu Eulenburg
II grade, Grand Officer Cross
 Kliment Boyadzhiev
 Cevat Çobanlı
 Ivan Fichev
 Julius Ringel
 Ferdinand Schörner
 Konstantin Zhostov
III grade, Commander Cross
 Rolf Andvord
 Wladimir Giesl von Gieslingen
 Panteley Kiselov
 Ivan Kolev (general)
 Konstantin Lukash
 Hristo Lukov
 Aleksandar Protogerov
 Vladimir Sukhomlinov
 Ivan Valkov
IV or V grade, Officer Cross
 Petar Darvingov
 Heinrich Jacobi (archaeologist)
 Stefan Nerezov
 Rudolf Toussaint
 Damyan Velchev
 Pencho Zlatev
VI grade, Silver Cross
Unknown Grades
 Michail Arnaudov
 Hans Baur
 Friedrich von Boetticher
 Georgi Bogdanov
 Michael von Faulhaber
 Friedrich von Georgi
 Hristo Matov
 Hans Michahelles
 Igor Moiseyev
 Stevan Mokranjac
 Dumitru C. Moruzi
 Eberhard Graf von Schmettow
 Simeon Saxe-Coburg-Gotha
 Vladimir Vazov

References

Sources
„Каталог Български ордени и медали“. Веселин Денков
„Българските ордени и медали 1878 - 2002“. Тодор Петров 
„Ордени и медали в България“. 1998 Тодор Петров 
„Българска Енциклопедия от А-Я“. 2005 Авторски колектив към БАН

Military awards and decorations of Bulgaria
Orders of chivalry of Bulgaria
Awards established in 1881
1881 establishments in Bulgaria